Center Square may refer to:

Centre Square, the area on which Philadelphia City Hall is built, in Pennsylvania
Dilworth Park, the western side of the original Centre Square
Centre Square (building), an office complex in Philadelphia
Center Square, Indiana, an unincorporated place
Center Square, Albany, New York, a neighborhood
The Center Square, an American web news site

See also
 Centre Square Mall